The Gamilaroi Nature Reserve is a protected nature reserve, part of the southern Brigalow Belt, that is located in the North West Slopes region of New South Wales, in eastern Australia. The reserve is one of seven sites in the state where ooline occurs naturally. For this reason, the reserve is not promoted for recreation; and visits are not encouraged.

Etymology
The name Gamilaroi is a name for the local Kamilaroi, the Indigenous people of the area.

Features
The primary objective of the reserve is the conservation of the rare ooline tree. Other interesting plant species occurring here are the wilga, white box, belah and mock olive. The shrub layer has affinities with coastal rainforests in the east. But other plants are usually seen in the drier western woodlands.

The rare grey-crowned babbler is recorded here. Animals recorded in the reserve include the eastern grey kangaroo, red-necked wallaby, swamp wallaby and the common dunnart. Threats to the reserve include clearing of vegetation, fire, weeds, genetic decline of the ooline, as well as damage and browsing by feral pigs and goats. The area was once part of a travelling stock route and was used for grazing.

See also

 Protected areas of New South Wales

References 

Nature reserves in New South Wales
North West Slopes
1994 establishments in Australia
Protected areas established in 1994